Southwest School District may refer to:
 Southwest R-1 School District (Missouri)
 Southwest R-5 School District (Missouri)
 Southwest Independent School District (Texas)

See also
 Southwest Schools (Texas charter school operator)